Cyrtodactylus brevipalmatus, also known commonly as the Kampuchea bow-fingered gecko or the short-hand forest gecko, is a species of lizard in the family Gekkonidae. The species is endemic to Thailand.

Geographic range
C. brevipalmatus is known from Nakhon Si Thammarat Province, Phetchaburi Province, and Phuket Province, Thailand.

Reproduction
C. brevipalmatus is oviparous.

References

Further reading
Smith MA (1923). "Notes on Reptiles and Batrachians from Siam and Indo-China (No. 2)". Journal of the Natural History Society of Siam, London 6 (1): 47–53. (Gymnodactylus brevipalmatus, new species, p. 48).
Taylor EH (1963). "The Lizards of Thailand". University of Kansas Science Bulletin 44: 687–1077. (Cyrtodactylus brevipalmatus, new combination, p. 709).

Cyrtodactylus
Reptiles of Thailand
Reptiles described in 1923